Piz Nair is a mountain of the Albula Alps in Switzerland, overlooking St. Moritz in the canton of Graubünden. Below the summit to the east is the Corviglia ski area. 

The mountain hosted the alpine skiing events for the 1948 Winter Olympics in neighboring St. Moritz. It also hosted the World Championships in 1934, 1974,  2003, and 2017.

Gallery

See also
List of mountains of Switzerland accessible by public transport
Corviglia
 St. Moritz–Corviglia Funicular

References

External links

 Piz Nair cable car
 Piz Nair on Hikr

Mountains of Graubünden
Mountains of the Alps
Venues of the 1948 Winter Olympics
Olympic alpine skiing venues
Engadin
Alpine three-thousanders
Tourist attractions in Switzerland
Cable cars in Switzerland
Mountains of Switzerland